Blockville is a hamlet located in western New York, United States, at the intersection of State Route 474 and County Route 35, between Panama and Ashville, in the town of Harmony in Chautauqua County. A Dollar General store is located in Blockville.

References

External links
 History of Chautauqua County, NY
 History of Harmony, NY
 Harmony Historical Society
 Blockville
 YOUR GOVERNMENT NEAR YOU = New York State 

Hamlets in New York (state)
Hamlets in Chautauqua County, New York